Kimbiri is a town in Southern Peru, capital of the district Kimbiri in the province La Convención in the region Cusco.

References

It is also the site of an Incan fortress known as Manco Pata.

External links
  Municipalidad Distrital de Kimbiri

Populated places in the Cusco Region